Désiré Jean Léon Vervoort (11 April 1810, in Antwerp – 9 July 1886, in Watermael-Boitsfort) was a Belgian lawyer and liberal politician. He was member of the Belgian parliament and President of the Belgian Chamber of Representatives from 23 November 1860 until 27 May 1863.

See also
 Liberal Party
 Liberalism in Belgium

Sources
 Désiré Jean Léon Vervoort
 Remy, F., in : Biographie Nationale, Brussels, Académie Royale des Sciences, des Lettres et des Beaux Arts, 1866–1986, XXXVIII, 1973–1974, kol. 807–809.
 De Paepe, Jean-Luc, Raindorf-Gérard, Christiane (ed.), Le Parlement Belge 1831-1894. Données Biographiques, Brussels, Académie Royale de Belgique, 1996, p. 604.

1810 births
1886 deaths
Politicians from Antwerp
Presidents of the Chamber of Representatives (Belgium)